Nikodim (Cyrillic: Никодим; born as Nikolai Vasilyevich Krotkov; 1868-1938) was a bishop of the Russian Orthodox Church, later the Archbishop of Kostroma and Galich.

He christmated Pavlo Skoropadsky as Hetman of Ukraine on April 29, 1918 in the Saint Sophia Cathedral. During the Revolutionary period in Ukraine 1917-1920 he served as a Metropolitan of Kiev and Galicia as a vicar to the murdered by Bolsheviks Metropolitan Vladimir. In 2000 he was recognized as a hieromartyr by the Russian Orthodox Church.

Biography
Nikodim was born in a family of a Russian priest from the Kostroma Eparchy as Nikolai Vasilyevich Krotkov. In 1889 he graduated from the Kostroma Theological Seminary, after which Krotkov was appointed as a teacher to a parish school. In 1896 he enrolled into the Kiev Theological Academy and on August 13, 1899 Krotkov was tonsured as a monk. In 1900 Krotkov finished the academy with a degree of a Candidate in Theology. In 1905 he was a rector of the Pskov Theological Seminary.

On November 11, 1907 Nikodim has been laid on of hands by Archbishop Anastasiy as bishop of Akkerman, vicar of Kishenev and Khotin Eparchy. Since November 16, 1911 he was a bishop of Chyhyryn, vicar of Kiev eparchy. On April 29, 1918 Nikodim christmated Pavlo Skoropadsky as Hetman of Ukraine in the Saint Sophia Cathedral, after which he conducted a service of intercession at the Sofiyivska Ploshcha (Sophia Square). Nikodim was against adopting an autocephaly of the Ukrainian Orthodoxy. Since 1921 he was a bishop of Taurida and Simferopol. In 1922 Nikodim was promoted to the rank of archbishop. From 1922 to 1932 he spent time in prison. From June 10, 1932 to January 2, 1937 Nikodim was an archbishop of Kostroma, after which he retired. Later Nikodim was repressed and convicted again. He died in prison.

External links
 Nikodim (Krotkov) (Historical memo in regards to the anathema on the Hetman Ivan Mazepa)
 Hieromartyr Nikodim, Archbishop of Kostroma and Galich
 This day in Russian history

1868 births
1938 deaths
People from Furmanovsky District
People from Nerekhtsky Uyezd
Bishops of the Russian Orthodox Church
Ukrainian State
Kiev Theological Academy alumni
Prisoners who died in Soviet detention
Russian saints of the Eastern Orthodox Church
20th-century Eastern Orthodox martyrs